Starkeya  is a genus of bacteria from the family of Xanthobacteraceae.

References

Further reading 
 
 
 

Hyphomicrobiales
Bacteria genera